The Commissioner of Crown Lands was a member of the Executive Council for the Province of Canada responsible for administering the surveying and sale of Crown land, the forests, mines, and fisheries of the Province. From 1841 to 1867 the Department of Crown Lands was the biggest of the Province of Canada's departments. It assumed responsibility for mining in 1846, for fisheries in 1857, and for Indian Affairs in 1860. It functioned on a dual basis, with each branch divided into two separate sections, one for Upper Canada and one for Lower Canada. After Canadian Confederation in 1867, responsibility for provincial crown land and for natural resources was assigned to the provinces (Ontario and Quebec) while responsibility for fisheries and Indian Affairs were transferred to the new federal government.

Assistant Commissioners of Crown Lands for the Province of Canada
 Louis-Tancrède Bouthillier, 19 August 1841, to 30 April 1850.
 Andrew Russell, 18 July 1857, to 30 June 1867.

References

Further reading
 

Commissioners of Crown Lands for the Province of Canada
Land management ministries
Indigenous affairs ministries
1827 establishments in the British Empire